Breed the Killers is the third full-length studio album by the American metallic hardcore band Earth Crisis, released in 1998. It was their major label debut and only release for Roadrunner Records, before subsequently returning to Victory Records. The last song on the album also appeared on their first release, All Out War.

The record was re-released on November 4, 2008 in the United States (November 7 in Europe) by I Scream Records. The album was remastered and features two live bonus tracks.

Track listing

Credits
Karl Buechner - vocals
Scott Crouse - guitar
Eric Edwards - guitar
Bulldog - bass
Dennis Merrick - drums
Screaming Lord Sneap - additional guitar on "Ultramilitance"
Robb Flynn from Machine Head - additional vocals on "One Against All"

References

1998 albums
Earth Crisis albums
Roadrunner Records albums
Albums produced by Andy Sneap